Cóndor Tuco or Condortuco (possibly from Quechua kuntur condor, t'uqu a niche, hole or gap in the wall, "condor niche") is a mountain in the Vilcanota mountain range in the Andes of Peru, about  high. It is situated in the Cusco Region, Canchis Province, Pitumarca District. Cóndor Tuco lies between the Chillcamayu in the west and the lake named Sibinacocha in the east, south of Jatunhuma, Huayruro Punco and Comercocha.

See also 
 Yanajaja

References

Mountains of Peru
Mountains of Cusco Region
Glaciers of Peru